German submarine U-1059 was a Type VIIF transport submarine of Nazi Germany's Kriegsmarine during World War II.

U-1059 was one of four Type VIIF torpedo transport submarines, which could carry 40 torpedoes, and were used to re-supply other U-boats at sea. U-1059 commissioned on 1 May 1943, first served with 5th U-boat Flotilla for training, and later served with 12th U-boat Flotilla from 1 January 1944 until 19 March 1944. U-1059 completed one torpedo transport patrol.

Design
As one of the four German Type VIIF submarines, U-1059 had a displacement of  when at the surface and  while submerged. She had two shafts and two  propellers.

U-1059 was fitted with five  torpedo tubes (four fitted at the bow and one at the stern), fourteen torpedoes, one  SK C/35 naval gun, 220 rounds, and various anti-aircraft gun. The boat had a normal complement of about forty-six.

Service history
Of U-1059’s crew, 47 were killed and 8 survived the attack. The survivors were taken to Boston for medical attention.

Bibliography

References

External links

German Type VIIF submarines
U-boats commissioned in 1943
U-boats sunk in 1943
World War II submarines of Germany
1943 ships
World War II shipwrecks in the Atlantic Ocean
U-boats sunk by US aircraft
Ships built in Kiel
Maritime incidents in March 1944